Ben G. Slater was a member of the Wisconsin State Assembly.

Biography
Slater was born on September 26, 1907 in Milwaukee, Wisconsin. In 1930, he graduated from Marquette University Law School and then practiced law. He died on August 2, 1998.

Career
Slater was a member of the Assembly from 1939 to 1940. Additionally, he was Honorary Sergeant-at-Arms of the 1936 Republican National Convention.

References

Politicians from Milwaukee
Republican Party members of the Wisconsin State Assembly
Wisconsin lawyers
Marquette University Law School alumni
1907 births
1998 deaths
20th-century American lawyers
20th-century American politicians